Shinca may refer to: 

 Shinca Entertainment, an American company
 Xinca people, an ethnic group of Mesoamerica
 Xinca language, their language(s)

See also 
 Șinca, a commune in Romania
 Shinka (disambiguation)
 Chinka (disambiguation)